The Adventurer of Tortuga is a 1964 Italian historical film directed by Luigi Capuano, released in 1965. It is based on the novel by Emilio Salgari.

Cast

External links
 

1965 films
1960s historical films
Italian historical films
1960s Italian-language films
Films directed by Luigi Capuano
Films based on Italian novels
Films based on works by Emilio Salgari
Films set in the 17th century
Pirate films
1960s Italian films